Best of 1990–2010 is a best of album by the German band Gregorian headed by Frank Peterson.

Track listing
 "So Sad"
 "Nothing Else Matters"
 "Moment of Peace"
 "Voyage, Voyage"
 "Hymn"
 "Join Me"
 "The Raven"
 "Angels"
 "The Forest"
 "Fix You"
 "One"
 "Happy Xmas (War Is Over)"
 "Sadeness (Part I)" * 
 "Forever Young" * 
 "Missing" * 
 "Let Down" * 
 "Sinners And Saints" * 
 "Crazy Crazy Nights" * 
* Previously unreleased and rare songs from the Gregorian archives

Certifications

References

2011 compilation albums
Covers albums
Gregorian (band) albums
Edel AG albums